Franz Brungs (born 4 December 1936) is a German retired football coach and player. As a player, he spent eight seasons in the Bundesliga with Borussia Dortmund, 1. FC Nürnberg and Hertha BSC.

Honours
 Bundesliga: 1967–68
 DFB-Pokal: 1959–60, 1964–65; runner-up 1962–63

External links
 
 Franz Brungs at glubberer.de

References

1936 births
Living people
People from Bad Honnef
Sportspeople from Cologne (region)
German footballers
Association football forwards
Bundesliga players
1. FC Köln players
Borussia Mönchengladbach players
Borussia Dortmund players
1. FC Nürnberg players
Hertha BSC players
German football managers
2. Bundesliga managers
KSV Hessen Kassel managers
Kickers Offenbach managers
SpVgg Greuther Fürth managers
Footballers from North Rhine-Westphalia
West German footballers
West German football managers